Tŭkchang District is a chigu in South P'yŏngan province, North Korea.

Tŭkchang was established as its own administrative area after separating from Pukch'ang in 1995.

Administrative districts
The district is split into four rodongjagu (workers' districts)in 1995:

The district is split into nine dong (neighborhoods) in 2008.

Transportation
Tŭkchang district is served by Myŏnghak Station in Myŏnghang-rodongjagu, the terminus of a branchline of the Korean State Railway's P'yŏngdŏk Line.

Prison Camp
Political Prison Camp No. 18 is a large prison labour colony in Tŭkchang district and Pukch'ang County at the banks of Taedong River. In 1995, Camp 18 Tukchang part was returned to ordinary society and is called “Tukchang Coal Mine Complex”(득장지구탄광련합기업소). The camp was dismantled in  2006 and maybe reopened in 2016.

References

External links
  Map of Pyongan provinces
  Detailed map

Districts of South Pyongan